Controcultura is the sixth studio album recorded by Italian rapper Fabri Fibra. It was released on 7 September 2010 by Universal Music Group. Controcultura was supported by the release of four singles: "Vip in Trip", "Tranne Te", "Qualcuno Normale", and "Le Donne". Commercially, the album topped the charts in Italy and peaked at number 79 in Switzerland.

Track listing

Charts

Weekly charts

Classification in 2010

Final classification

Certifications

References 

2010 albums
Albums produced by Dot da Genius
Fabri Fibra albums
Universal Music Italy albums